Eresiomera kiellandi is a butterfly in the family Lycaenidae. It is found in north-western Tanzania. The habitat consists of forests.

References

Endemic fauna of Tanzania
Butterflies described in 1998
Poritiinae